Andropolia olorina is a moth in the family Noctuidae first described by Augustus Radcliffe Grote in 1876. It is found in California and Nevada.

The wingspan is about 50 mm.

Subspecies
Andropolia olorina olorina
Andropolia olorina australiae

References

External links

Acronictinae
Moths of North America
Moths described in 1876